Violeta Nikolaeva Ninova (born 19 August 1963) is a Bulgarian rower.

Life and career
Ninova won a bronze medal in Double sculls with her partner Stefka Madina at the 1988 Seoul Olympic Games. She was born in Sofia.

References

External links
 

1963 births
Living people
Bulgarian female rowers
Olympic rowers of Bulgaria
Olympic bronze medalists for Bulgaria
Olympic medalists in rowing
Rowers at the 1988 Summer Olympics
Rowers at the 1992 Summer Olympics
World Rowing Championships medalists for Bulgaria
Medalists at the 1988 Summer Olympics